Ferdy the Ant (also simply referred to as Ferdy and Ferda) is a 1984 German-British children's animated television series based on the Ferda Mravenec series of picture books by Czech author Ondřej Sekora. The animation was handled by Far Eastern Productions.

There are three English dubs. The original British English dub, the short-lived Harmony Gold USA dub and an American-produced 2000 dub.

The show is primarily aimed towards children from ages 3 to 10, and has been owned by Entertaining Cartoon Productions and Licensing AG since 2000 and it was also an animation by Far Eastern Animation in Taiwan.

It was also International Broadcast on the ABC & ABC Kids in Australia.

Premise
The series revolves around a little boy-ant named Ferdy as he embarks on a variety of adventures in the insect Utopia of Käfertal with his close insect friends.

Episode format
Story-arcs usually last up to seven episodes.

Main characters
 Ferdy
 Bug Butterfingers
 Cricket
 Arambula
 Woody
 Gwendolyn (Referred to as Laura in later episodes) 
 Bug Sniffy
 Bug Gobbler
 Oskar

Episodes 

 The Daring Rescue
 The Danger from the Mill
 The Crazy Snail Trip
 The Valley of the Horses
 My Friend the Star
 On Butterfinger's Trail
 A Coach for Gwendolyn
 The Search
 False Witness
 The Camp of the Red Ants
 The Silver Grotto
 The Ghost Mill
 The Robbers
 Dangerous Excursion
 Playing With Water
 The New House
 The Cuckoo's Egg
 The Spring Festival
 The Heatwave
 The Trip to Italy
 The Ill-Fated Skiing Trip
 The Flight in a Balloon
 Butterfinger's Art School
 On a Treasure Hunt
 The Forest Fire
 Homesickness
 The Mysterious Ship
 Ferdy in the Ant Hill
 The Slavedealers
 The Raid
 The Battle
 The Wedding Feast
 Movie Stars
 The Unknown Weapon
 A Nightmare Diet
 The Honey Knight
 The Tortise
 The Dream of the Wild West
 The Visitor From Space
 The Beauty Contest
 The Circus
 Gwendolyn's Birthday
 Robin Hood
 The Ghost Driver
 The Pizzeria
 The Owl's Book
 The Toadstool
 The Waterskiing Race
 The Musical
 The Easter Egg
 The Snake
 Hocus-Pocus

Video game
A 3D episodic arcade video game based on the series was developed by Centauri Productions and released by Cenega in 2002 for the PC.

Home media
In 1986, select episodes of the Harmony Gold USA English dub of the series received a small VHS release in the US. The entire series was released on DVD in the Czech Republic in 2003.

References

1980s British animated television series
Czech animated television series
German children's animated adventure television series
Fictional ants
Animated television series about insects